John Hiram Johnson House is a historic home located near Saluda, Polk County, North Carolina.  It was built about 1887, and is a small, one-story, Quaker plan frame dwelling, sheathed in weatherboard and on a stacked fieldstone foundation.  It has a full-facade front porch and a rear ell and shed addition.  Also on the property are the contributing log smokehouse (c. 1935) and frame barn (c. 1935).  It is representative of a late-19th century vernacular subsistence dwelling.

It was added to the National Register of Historic Places in 1994.

References

Houses on the National Register of Historic Places in North Carolina
Houses completed in 1887
Houses in Polk County, North Carolina
National Register of Historic Places in Polk County, North Carolina